Jammavaram is a village near Kanchikacherla, Andhra Pradesh, India, located in  Veerullapadu Mandal.

It has a population of about 1400, and literacy rate is above 70%.

Supreme Court Chief Justice N V Ramana who sworn in on 24 April 2021 
has studied from 6th to 8th class in ZPH school in Jammavaram.

References

Villages in Krishna district